Polak, also spelled Polack, Poláček, or Pollack, is a surname common in Germany, Denmark, the Czech Republic, and the United States. One of its meanings may be Polish man. It may refer to:

Polak
 Jacques J. Polak, Dutch economist
 Benjamin Polak, British professor of economics
 Sjaak Polak, Dutch footballer
 Graham Polak, Australian Football League player
 Maralyn Lois Polak, American writer
 Roman Polák, Czech ice hockey player

Polack
 Elizabeth Polack (fl. mid-19th century), English playwright
 Israel Polack (1909–1993), Austro-Hungarian-born Romanian, Chilean, and Israeli textile industrialist
 Jan Polack (1435–1519), Polish painter
 Joel Samuel Polack (1807–1882), first Jewish settler in New Zealand
 Maria Polack (1787–1849), English novelist

Poláček
 František Poláček, Czech boxer
 Karel Poláček, Czech writer
 Tomáš Poláček, Czech footballer
 Zlatko Poláček, Czechoslovak sport shooter

Polachek

 Caroline Polachek (born 1985), American singer
 JJ Polachek, American singer and vocalist of 7 Horns 7 Eyes
 Shlomo Polachek (1877–1928), Lithuanian rabbi

Polaczek
 Jerzy Polaczek (born 1961), Polish politician

Pollack

External links

Slavic-language surnames
Jewish surnames
Ethnonymic surnames
de:Polak
fr:Polak
it:Polack (disambigua)
nl:Polak
ja:ポラック
pl:Polak